So You Think You Can Dance is an Indian Hindi competitive dance television series, which went on air on 24 April 2016 and is broadcast on &TV. The series is produced by Deepak Dhar, then CEO of Endemol Shine India. The series is aired on every Saturday and Sunday nights. The show is an officially incensed version of the So You Think You Can Dance franchise, based on the original American production created by Dick Clark Productions. The auditions of the show commenced in the second half of February 2016.  The show is being hosted by Rithvik Dhanjani and Mouni Roy, with a jury of Madhuri Dixit, Terence Lewis, and Bosco Martis.

The competitors will perform dances in any of several permitted dance styles—such as Indian and Western dance forms—before a common group of judges.

Contestants

Team Street

Team Stage

Elimination Table

Color Keys

 Winner
 Runner-up
 Finalist
 Safe
 Bottom 3
 Eliminated

References

External links
Official website
So You Think You Can Dance India Audition Dates

2016 Indian television series debuts
2016 Indian television series endings
Hindi-language television shows
Indian reality television series
India
&TV original programming
Indian television series based on American television series